Republican Liberal Party may refer to:
Republican Liberal Party (Panama)
Republican Liberal Party (Portugal) (1919–1923)

See also
 Liberal Republican Party (disambiguation)
 Republican Party (disambiguation)